Deepwater Horizon was a drilling rig that sank in the Gulf of Mexico on 22 April 2010.

Deepwater Horizon may also refer to:
 Deepwater Horizon (film), a 2016 American disaster drama film
 Deepwater Horizon explosion
 Deepwater Horizon oil spill

See also